Jordy ter Borgh (born 5 May 1994 in Amsterdam) is a Dutch professional footballer who plays as a midfielder for DOVO on loan from Eerste Divisie side TOP Oss. He also formerly played for Almere City FC and Fortuna Sittard.

Club career

Early career
Ter Borgh began his football career in the youth ranks of his local club Omniworld. In 2010 the club was renamed Almere City FC. In 2012 ter Borgh was on trial at Ipswich Town FC, an English football club based in Ipswich, who play in the Football League Championship.

Almere City FC
Ter Borgh made his official debut in 2013/2014 for Almere City FC against FC Oss on Friday the 4 April 2014. Ter Borgh is the first Almere City FC youth player to have successfully made his first-team debut.

Fortuna Sittard
On Friday 27 June 2014, ter Borgh signed a two-year deal. Ter Borgh was acquired by Fortuna Sittard as a free transfer from Almere City FC. At the beginning of January 2016, Fortuna Sittard announced on their website that the club and ter Borgh would part.

TOP Oss
Ter Borgh joined TOP Oss in the summer of 2017. After only playing one game for two years, he was loaned out to DOVO on 23 August 2019 for the rest of the season.

References

External links
 
 
 Voetbalzone profile
 

1994 births
Living people
Footballers from Amsterdam
Association football midfielders
Dutch footballers
Almere City FC players
Fortuna Sittard players
SC Heerenveen players
TOP Oss players
VV DOVO players
Eredivisie players
Eerste Divisie players
Derde Divisie players